Roxann is a feminine given name. Notable people with the name include:

Roxann Dawson (born 1958), American actress, television producer and director
Roxann Robinson (born 1956), American politician

See also
Roxanne (disambiguation)

Feminine given names